NOTE: This article is about wild yams as used in Southern areas of Tanzania, for other information see yam.

"Ming'oko" 
() are the roots which are used as food in Southern areas of Tanzania especially Mtwara and sometimes Lindi.
They are eaten after being cooked.
Ming'oko are found from climbing trees as roots in the forests which are not disturbed by human activities including agriculture. Ming'oko are wild edible yams and are in Dioscorea hirtiflora species. According to some villagers in Mtwara rural areas, who are familiar with them, there are different wild tubers similar to Ming'oko but they are not edible according to those areas and people should not be confused while harvesting otherwise they could eat wild yam which are not real Ming'oko. The one of common wild yams which are not edible but they are very identical to Ming'oko are traditionally called Malondolo or lilondolo when mentioned in singular forms, note that, these traditional terms are originally based on Makonde language but they are now very common used even in Kiswahili when discussing issues about Ming'oko in Mtwara areas or Southern east of Tanzania in general.Malondolo are thicker than Ming'oko

PreparationAfter  ming'oko being dug as needed, they are rinsed to remove soil residues and then cooked.
Salt is added while cooking to add better flavour.

They can be eaten singly or pounded in traditional mortar to form new stiff food known as chikandanga, a Makonde word which is related to the process of pounding ming'oko for chikandanga.
Sometimes, chikandanga can be eaten with ugali if it is pounded with manioc flour and other traditional additives found from seeds, in this time it's called nnabuhulile.

Planting
Ming'oko are found on plants called mitipu which they grow naturally in the forest under no control of human being, as they are not given fertilizer instead they grow where there is fertile soil. However they have been, in research, being planted but there is still no specific plantation on which they can be harvested.

See also
 Dioscorea villosa
 Yam (vegetable)
 Ugali

References

Root vegetables